Sayyid Mubarak Ali Khan (1759 – 6 September 1793), better known as Mubarak ud-Daulah (spelled also as: Mubarak ud-Daula), was the Nawab of Bengal and Bihar. He was the son of Mir Jafar and Babbu Begum.

He ascended the throne on 21 March 1770 after his half-brother, Ashraf Ali Khan's death on 10 March 1770. Mubarak Ali Khan was succeeded by his son, Babar Ali Khan after his death on 6 September 1793.

Life

Early years

Nawab Nazim Mubarak Ali Khan, better known as Mubarak ud-Daulah was the son of Mir Jafar by Babbu Begum. He succeeded his half brother, Ashraf Ali Khan, at the age of 12 years, after Ashraf Ali Khan's death on 24 March 1770. Warren Hastings appointed Mubarak ud-Daulah's stepmother, Munny Begum, his guardian though, his mother Babbu Begum was alive. The reason that why the guardianship was not given Babbu Begum has never been satisfactorily explained.

Later years

In 1790, the Queen of the Mughal Emperor Shah Alam II, asked, through Lord Cornwallis, for one of Nawab Mubarak ud-Daulah's daughters in marriage with her son. The Nawab rejected the offer in the following terms, in a letter to Lord Cornwallis:

Please request the Queen to pass over the matter. I cannot, by any means, accede to the proposal. there are many obstacles in the matter. Moreover, there is a longstanding usage in my family, that our daughters can never be given in marriage to any one other than Sayyids. If I act contrary to this, my family custom, I shall be ruined. At all events, my mother and I cannot accept the offer.
—Nawab Nazim Mubarak ud-Daulah of Bengal

Although, the Nawab, then had 13 daughters, and to some extent regarded himself as a servant of the Emperor, he, for family reasons, did not allow the marriage of one of the 13 with even such an honourable prince as the Prince of Delhi.

Death and succession

Nawab Nazim Mubarak ud-Daulah died on 6 September 1793. He was succeeded by his son, Baber Ali Khan after his death.

Marriage

Principal wives
The following are the principal wives of Nawab Nazim Mubarak Ali Khan:

Mut‘ah wives
The following are the mut‘ah wives of Nawab Nazim Mubarak Ali Khan:

Children
The following is the list of the children of Nawab Nazim Mubarak Ali Khan:

See also
 Nawabs of Bengal
 List of rulers of Bengal
 History of Bengal
 History of Bangladesh
 History of India
 Shia Islam in India

External links
  Site dedicated to Nawab Nazim Mubarak Ali Khan, better known as Mubarak ud-Daulah

1759 births
1793 deaths
Nawabs of Bengal
18th-century Indian monarchs